The Sahtaneh River is a river in the Mackenzie River watershed in British Columbia, Canada.

See also
Snake River (Sahtaneh River tributary)

Sources 

Rivers of British Columbia
Peace River Land District